Balthasar of Hanau-Münzenberg (29 June 1508 – 9 December 1534, in Hanau) was a posthumous son of Count Reinhard IV of Hanau-Münzenberg (1473 - 1512) and his wife Countess Catherine of Schwarzburg-Blankenburg (d. 1514).

Life 
From 1529, he acted as co-regent for his nephew, Count Philip III, whose father had died young.  He continued the construction of fortifications around Hanau, which his brother Philip II had begun.  He supplemented the fortresses with a defensive ring according to the latest technical standard of the Renaissance.

Balthasar never married.  Like most male members of the Hanau-Münzenberg line, he died young, in 1534, at the age of 26.  He was buried in the church of St. Mary in Hanau.

One of Hanau's city gates was decorated with a bust of Balthasar, until the gate was demolished in the 18th century.  The bust fell into the hands of the Historical Society of Hanau.  It was destroyed when the city was bombed on 19 March 1945.  Only drawings of it remain.

Ancestors

References 
 Reinhard Dietrich: Die Landes-Verfaßung in dem Hanauischen. Die Stellung der Herren und Grafen in Hanau-Münzenberg aufgrund der archivalischen Quellen, in the series Hanauer Geschichtsblätter, vol. 34, Hanauer Geschichtsverein, Hanau, 1996, 
 Eckhard Meise: Bernhard Hundeshagen — kein Denkmalschutz im Hanau des frühen 19. Jahrhunderts, in: Neues Magazin für hanauische Geschichte, 2006, p. 3–61.
 Reinhard Suchier: Genealogie des Hanauer Grafenhauses, in: Reinhard Suchier (ed.): Festschrift des Hanauer Geschichtsvereins zu seiner fünfzigjährigen Jubelfeier am 27. August 1894, Heydt, Hanau, 1894, p. 7–23.
 Ernst J. Zimmermann: Hanau Stadt und Land. Kulturgeschichte und Chronik einer fränkisch-wetterauischen Stadt und ehemaligen Grafschaft. Mit besonderer Berücksichtigung der älteren Zeit, 3rd extended edition, self-published, Hanau, 1919, reprinted: Peters, Hanau, 1978,

Footnotes 

House of Hanau
Regents of Germany
1508 births
1534 deaths
16th-century German people